These are the official results of the Men's Long Jump event at the 1994 European Championships in Helsinki, Finland, held at Helsinki Olympic Stadium on 9 and 10 August 1994. There were a total number of 34 participating athletes, with two qualifying groups.

Medalists

Results

Final
Held on 10 August

Qualification
Held on 9 August

Group A

Group B

Participation
According to an unofficial count, 33 athletes from 19 countries participated in the event.

 (1)
 (1)
 (1)
 (2)
 (1)
 (2)
 (3)
 (3)
 (2)
 (3)
 (3)
 (1)
 (2)
 (3)
 (1)
 (1)
 (1)
 (1)
 (1)

See also
 1990 Men's European Championships Long Jump (Split)
 1991 Men's World Championships Long Jump (Tokyo)
 1992 Men's Olympic Long Jump (Barcelona)
 1993 Men's World Championships Long Jump (Stuttgart)
 1994 Long Jump Year Ranking
 1995 Men's World Championships Long Jump (Gothenburg)
 1996 Men's Olympic Long Jump (Atlanta)
 1997 Men's World Championships Long Jump (Athens)
 1998 Men's European Championships Long Jump (Budapest)

References

 rzutyiskoki.pl - Results 
 Results

Long jump
Long jump at the European Athletics Championships